Zoleka Mandela (born 9 April 1980) is a South African writer, activist, and Nelson Mandela's granddaughter. She has written about her addictions, her daughter's death, and her own battles with breast cancer.

Life
Zoleka Mandela was born in 1980 and is the daughter of Zindzi Mandela and her first husband Zwelibanzi Hlongwane. Her mother's family, the Mandelas, are direct descendants of King Madiba of the Thembu people and serve as 
chieftains of Mvezo, their ancestral chiefdom.

Zoleka has spoken about sexual abuse in her childhood. She was also addicted to drugs and alcohol for a time.

In 2010, Zoleka Mandela's 13-year-old daughter, Zenani, was killed in a car crash on the way home from a concert. The accident was said to be due to drugs and, at the time, Zoleka Mandela was recovering from a suicide attempt. Mandela published her autobiography in 2013.

Health
Zoleka Mandela was treated for breast cancer in 2011, which returned in 2016. She has used social media to describe the removed tumour and the side effects of her chemotherapy treatment.

Other
In 2016, she was chosen as one of the BBC's "100 Women". She noted that her big regret was that she felt that she has only done worthwhile things since her grandfather's death, not while he was alive.

She campaigned against deaths caused by road accidents noting the particular hazards affecting sub Saharan African children who are twice as likely to be killed in car accidents as children anywhere else in the world.

References

1980 births
Mandela family
South African activists
South African women activists
South African writers
Living people
BBC 100 Women